Mike Poto (born 15 January 1981) is a Zambian former football goalkeeper who played for Green Buffaloes in Zambia. He has played for the Zambian national team.

External links

1981 births
Living people
Zambian footballers
Association football goalkeepers
2008 Africa Cup of Nations players
Green Buffaloes F.C. players
People from Mufulira
Zambia international footballers
2009 African Nations Championship players
Zambia A' international footballers